Twywell Gullet is a  biological Site of Special Scientific Interest east of Kettering in Northamptonshire. It is part of the 54.6 hectare Twywell Hills and Dales nature reserve, which is managed by a partnership of the Woodland Trust and the Rockingham Forest Trust. The site is in turn a small part of the former royal hunting Rockingham Forest.

Twywell Gullet is a former ironstone quarry which has deep cuttings with steeply sloping banks. It has species-rich limestone grassland on the slopes and ponds and scrub in the bottoms. There are a number of uncommon ground nesting bees and wasps, and beetles include the nationally rare ruddy darter. There is a large pond which has a large reedbed and many great crested newts.

Footpaths go through the site but there is no access to some steeply sloping areas.

References

Sites of Special Scientific Interest in Northamptonshire